The 1985–86 NBA season was the 40th season of the National Basketball Association. The season ended with the Boston Celtics winning their third championship of the decade, beating the Houston Rockets 4 games to 2 in the NBA Finals.

Notable occurrences

The 1986 NBA All-Star Game was played at Reunion Arena in Dallas, Texas, with the East defeating the West 139–132. Isiah Thomas of the Detroit Pistons wins the game's MVP award. To add to the All-Star Weekend festivities, 5-foot-7-inch Spud Webb of the Atlanta Hawks wins the slam-dunk competition. The first three-point shootout was also held, won by Larry Bird (his first of three consecutive).
The Kings relocate from Kansas City, Missouri to Sacramento, California. They played their home games at ARCO Arena I for three seasons while ARCO Arena II was under construction.
The Chicago Bulls are the last Eastern Conference team in NBA history to lose 50 or more games in a season and still make the playoffs.
The Boston Celtics post an impressive 40–1 (.976) record at home. Their only regular-season home loss occurred on December 6, 1985, to the Portland Trail Blazers, by the score of 121–103. The record would be tied by the San Antonio Spurs in the 2015–16 season. The Celtics would also win all 10 of their home games in the postseason.
This season marks the first time the NBA hands out a Most Improved Player award at the end of a season. Alvin Robertson of the San Antonio Spurs is the first to win the award. Robertson would also set the record for consecutive games with a steal (105), which stood for 22 years.
In the third game of the season, Chicago Bulls sensation Michael Jordan suffered a broken left foot and missed the next 64 games.  In Game 2 of the Eastern Conference First Round series, Jordan scored 63 points against Boston, an NBA playoff record, but his Chicago Bulls would lose in double overtime.
All Midwest Division teams make the playoffs, the first time an entire division had done this since the 1983–84 season when all Atlantic Division teams made the playoffs.
The first NBA draft of the Lottery Era was conducted at the Felt Forum of Madison Square Garden in New York City. Patrick Ewing was selected as the first overall pick by the New York Knicks. Ewing, the winner of the NBA Rookie of the Year Award that season, set the record for most games missed (32) for a Rookie of the Year winner.
Ralph Sampson's off-balanced buzzer-beating shot in Game 5 of the Western Conference Finals sent the Houston Rockets to their second NBA Finals, defeating the erstwhile defending champion Los Angeles Lakers 4–1. This marked the second and last time in the 1980s a team other than the Lakers represented the West in the NBA Finals (1981, also by the Rockets). The Rockets fell in six games to the Boston Celtics, a similar result to their previous meeting five years earlier.
Detlef Schrempf became the first German player to enter the NBA. He would later become the first European-born player to be named an All-Star in 1993 and had the most number of seasons played for a European player.
New Jersey Nets guard Micheal Ray Richardson was banned for life by the NBA for his third violation of the league's anti-drug policy. Houston Rockets guard John Lucas was also suspended by the team for a similar violation; had he not been suspended, he would've played in the NBA Finals for the first time.
 On Wednesday, October 30, 1985, forward Georgi Glouchkov arrived in the U.S. from Bulgaria to play for the Phoenix Suns.  He was the first player from a former Eastern Bloc country to play in the NBA.  He would make his debut on Wednesday, November 6 against the Atlanta Hawks.
The Los Angeles Clippers surprised the league by starting the season 5–0.  The Denver Nuggets were the last undefeated team, starting the season 6–0.  The New York Knicks started the season 0–8 in the midst of a 20-game losing streak.  The Knicks' last victory was March 22, 1985.  The Phoenix Suns were the last winless team, starting the season 0–9.
On Saturday, November 30, 1985, Cleveland Cavalier World B. Free scored his 16,000th career point.
On Wednesday, December 4, 1985, Maurice Lucas of the Los Angeles Lakers made a 60-foot shot at the regulation buzzer to send the game into overtime.  The Lakers would go on to defeat the Utah Jazz 131–127.
On Tuesday, December 10, 1985, the Indiana Pacers scored only 64 points in a 64–82 loss to the New York Knicks.  It was the fewest points scored by a team in 13 years – since an October 21, 1972 game in which the Buffalo Braves managed only 63 against the Milwaukee Bucks.  Indiana's 64 was the fourth lowest total since the NBA implemented the 24-second shot clock in 1954–55.
The Los Angeles Lakers started the season 19–2.
On Wednesday, December 25, 1985, in a matchup of one of the worst teams in the league (New York Knicks, 10–19) against one of the best (Boston Celtics, 21–7), the Knicks defeated Boston in double overtime, 113–104.  Rookie Patrick Ewing had 32 points and 11 rebounds for the Knicks.
On Tuesday, January 14, 1986, the Utah Jazz snapped the Houston Rockets' 20-game home winning streak with a 105–102 victory.  Both Akeem Olajuwon and Ralph Sampson foul out of the game.
On Wednesday, January 15, 1986, the Golden State Warriors scored 150 points in a 150–104 regulation victory over the Utah Jazz.  None of Golden State's starters played in the fourth quarter.  Eight Golden State players scored in double figures.
On Wednesday, January 22, 1986, the Boston Celtics (31–8) defeated the defending champion Los Angeles Lakers (32–8) 110–95 in a matchup of the league's two best teams.
On Friday, January 24, 1986, the Boston Celtics (32–8) overtook the Los Angeles Lakers (32–9) as the team with the best record in the NBA.  The Celtics maintained the league's best record for the remainder of the season.
On Thursday, February 6, 1986, Kareem Abdul-Jabbar of the Los Angeles Lakers scored 46 points in a game against the Houston Rockets, his highest single-game total since a 48-point performance against the Portland Trail Blazers on November 26, 1975.  The Lakers defeated the Rockets 117–95.
On Sunday, February 16, 1986, in the season's second matchup between the Celtics and Lakers, Boston won again, 105–99.
On Tuesday, February 18, 1986, Alvin Robertson of the San Antonio Spurs recorded the second quadruple-double in NBA history.  He scored 20 points, grabbed 11 rebounds, dished 10 assists and stole the ball 10 times in a 114–96 victory over the Phoenix Suns.
On Sunday, April 6, 1986, the Houston Rockets (50–29) set a franchise record for wins in a season with a 109–103 win over the Los Angeles Lakers.  It was also the Rockets' first victory over the Lakers at The Summit (Houston's home arena) since a 107–104 victory on November 12, 1980.
Backboard height is shortened  to the present .

Final standings

By division

By conference

Notes
z – Clinched home court advantage for the entire playoffs
c – Clinched home court advantage for the conference playoffs
y – Clinched division title 
x – Clinched playoff spot

Playoffs

Teams in bold advanced to the next round. The numbers to the left of each team indicate the team's seeding in its conference, and the numbers to the right indicate the number of games the team won in that round. The division champions are marked by an asterisk. Home court advantage does not necessarily belong to the higher-seeded team, but instead the team with the better regular season record; teams enjoying the home advantage are shown in italics.

Statistics leaders

NBA awards

Yearly awards
Most Valuable Player: Larry Bird, Boston Celtics
Rookie of the Year: Patrick Ewing, New York Knicks
Defensive Player of the Year: Alvin Robertson, San Antonio Spurs
Sixth Man of the Year: Bill Walton, Boston Celtics
Most Improved Player: Alvin Robertson, San Antonio Spurs
Coach of the Year: Mike Fratello, Atlanta Hawks

All-NBA First Team:
F – Larry Bird, Boston Celtics
F – Dominique Wilkins, Atlanta Hawks
C – Kareem Abdul-Jabbar, Los Angeles Lakers
G – Isiah Thomas, Detroit Pistons
G – Magic Johnson, Los Angeles Lakers

All-NBA Second Team:
F – Charles Barkley, Philadelphia 76ers
F – Alex English, Denver Nuggets
C – Akeem Olajuwon, Houston Rockets
G – Sidney Moncrief, Milwaukee Bucks
G – Alvin Robertson, San Antonio Spurs

All-NBA Rookie Team:
Joe Dumars, Detroit Pistons
Charles Oakley, Chicago Bulls
Patrick Ewing, New York Knicks
Xavier McDaniel, Seattle SuperSonics
Karl Malone, Utah Jazz

NBA All-Defensive First Team:
Paul Pressey, Milwaukee Bucks
Kevin McHale, Boston Celtics
Mark Eaton, Utah Jazz
Sidney Moncrief, Milwaukee Bucks
Maurice Cheeks, Philadelphia 76ers

NBA All-Defensive Second Team:
Michael Cooper, Los Angeles Lakers
Bill Hanzlik, Denver Nuggets
Manute Bol, Washington Bullets
Alvin Robertson, San Antonio Spurs
Dennis Johnson, Boston Celtics

Player of the week
The following players were named NBA Player of the Week.

Player of the month
The following players were named NBA Player of the Month.

Rookie of the month
The following players were named NBA Rookie of the Month.

Coach of the month
The following coaches were named NBA Coach of the Month.

References